The Green Mountain Boys flag, also known as the Stark flag, is a reconstruction of a regimental flag commonly stated to have been used by the Green Mountain Boys. A remnant of a Green Mountain Boys flag, originally belonging to John Stark, is owned by the Bennington Museum. It still exists as one of the few regimental flags from the American Revolution. Although Stark was at the Battle of Bennington and likely flew this flag, the battle has become more commonly associated with the Bennington flag, which is believed to be a 19th-century banner.

Today the flag is used as the regimental flag of the Vermont National Guard unit. The regimental flag, known also as a "battle flag" or war flag, accompanies the unit on battle assignments and is physically handed to the commander of the regiment, as described by former Vermont National Guard Adjutant General Martha Rainville in an interview. The flag is also a symbol of the Vermont secessionist movement. The Castleton University football team has also featured the flag in its pre-game ceremonies since its inception in 2009.

Design
The common reconstruction consists of a green field and a constellation of thirteen five-pointed white stars representing the thirteen colonies arranged in a natural pattern within an azure canton. The existing fragments consist of the canton from the flag, which has remnants of green silk on three sides, and a piece of green cloth with flourish from elsewhere on the flag.

See also
 Green Mountain Boys
 Vermont Republic
 Flag of Vermont

References

Footnotes

Notations
 Van de Water, Frederic Franklyn The Reluctant Republic: Vermont 1724–1791. The Countryman Press: 1974. .

Flags introduced in 1776
Flags of the American Revolution
Symbols of Vermont
Pre-statehood history of Vermont
Flags of the United States
Flags of Vermont